

Middlecamp Hills Conservation Park is a protected area in the Australian state of South Australia located on the Eyre Peninsula in the gazetted locality of Cowell about  west of the town centre in Cowell.

The conservation park was proclaimed on 24 September 1977 under the state's National Parks and Wildlife Act 1972 in respect to land in section 342 in the cadastral unit of the Hundred of Hawker.

The conservation park is classified as an IUCN Category IA protected area.

See also
Protected areas of South Australia

References

External links
Entry for Middlecamp Hills Conservation Park on the Protected Planet website

Conservation parks of South Australia
Protected areas established in 1977
1977 establishments in Australia
Eyre Peninsula